Ancient Near Eastern Texts Relating to the Old Testament edited by James B. Pritchard (1st ed. 1950, 2nd ed.1955, 3rd ed. 1969) is an anthology of important historical, legal, mythological, liturgical, and secular texts from the ancient Near East.  In spite of the name, the included texts have broad coverage and do not necessarily relate to the Old Testament. William W. Hallo, writing in the Journal of the American Oriental Society in 1970, described it as "a modern classic ever since its first appearance in 1950", because "for the first time it assembled some of the most significant Ancient Near Eastern texts in authoritative, generously annotated English translations based on the accumulated insight of several generations of scholarship scattered". It is conventional to cite the work as ANET. ANEP refers to a companion volume Ancient Near Eastern Pictures Relating to the Old Testament (1st ed. 1954, 2nd ed. 1969), featuring 882 black and white designs and photos. An additional volume of supplementary texts and pictures was published in 1969 as "The Ancient Near East: Supplementary Texts and Pictures Relating to the Old Testament". An abridgement of ANET and ANEP was published in a single volume in 1958 as "The Ancient Near East, Volume I: An Anthology of Texts and Pictures" with a 2nd edition published in 1965. A second anthology of supplementary material was published in 1975 as "Ancient Near East, Volume 2: A New Anthology of Texts and Pictures".

Publication
The book was published by Princeton University Press, Princeton, New Jersey, in 1950. A second edition, corrected and enlarged, appeared in 1955.  A third further enlarged edition appeared in 1969.

Contents
I.        Myths, Epics and Legends: Egyptian (John A. Wilson); Sumerian (S. N. Kramer); Akkadian (E. A. Speiser); Hittite (Albrecht Goetze); Ugaritic (H. L. Ginsberg)
Egyptian
The Memphite Theology of Creation
The Deliverance of Mankind of Destruction 
The Story of Sinahue
The Story of Two Brothers
The Journey of Wen-Amon to Phoenicia
The Tradition of Seven Lean Years in Egypt
Mesopotamian
A Sumerian Myth-The Deluge
The Akkadian Creation Epic
The Akkadian Epic of Gilgamesh
An Akkadian Cosmological Incantation: The Worm and the Toothache
Adapa (Akkadian)
Descent of Ishtar to the Nether World (Akkadian)
The Legend of Sargon (Akkadian)
Hittite
The Telepinus Myth
Ugaritic
Poem about Baal and Anath
The Tale of Aqhat
II.        Legal Texts: Mesopotamia and Asia Minor; Egyptian and Hittite Treaties; Hittite Instructions (Albrecht Goetze); Documents from the Practice of Law
Laws of Eshnunna
The Code of Hammurabi
Mesopotamian Legal Documents
Aramaic Papyri from Elephantine
III.           Historical Texts: Egyptian (John A. Wilson); Babylonian and Assyrian (A. Leo Oppenheim); Hittite (Albrecht Goetze); Palestinian Inscriptions (W. F. Albright)
Egyptian
The Expulsion of the Hyksos
Asiatic Campaign of Thut-mose III
The Campaign of Seti I in North Palestine
The Report of a Frontier Official
A Syrian Interregnum
The War Against the Peoples of the Sea
The Meggido Ivories
The Campaign of Sheshonk
Assyrian & Babylonian
Ashurnasirpal II (883-859): Expedition to Lebanon
Adad-nirari III (810-783): The Fight against the Aramaean Coalition
Tiglath-pileser III (744-727): The Campaigns Against Syria and Palestine
Sargon II (721-705): The Fall of Samaria
Sennacherib (704-681): The Siege of Jerusalem
Esarhaddon (680-669): The Syro-Palestinian Campaign
 Receipt of Tribute from Palestine
Historiographic
The Fall of Ninevah
The Fall of Jerusalem
The Fall of Babylon
Nebuchadnezzar II (605-562)
Cyrus (557-529)
Also:
Rituals, Incantations and Descriptions of Festivals: Egyptian (John A. Wilson); Akkadian (A. Sachs); Hittite (Albrecht Goetze)
Hymns and Prayers: Egyptian (John A. Wilson); Sumerian (S. N. Kramer); Sumero-Akkadian (Ferris J. Stephens); Hittite (Albrecht Goetze)
Didactic and Wisdom Literature: Fables and Didactic Tales; Proverbs and Precepts; Observations on Life and the World Order; Oracles and Prophecies
Lamentations: A Sumerian Lamentation (S. N. Kramer)
Secular Songs and Poems: Egyptian (John A. Wilson)
Letters: Egyptian (John A. Wilson); Sumerian (S. N. Kramer); Akkadian (W. F. Albright); Aramaic (H. L. Ginsberg)
Miscellaneous Texts: Egyptian (John A. Wilson); Sumerian Love Song (S. N. Kramer); Hittite Omen (Albrecht Goetze); Canaanite and Aramaic Inscriptions (Franz Rosenthal); South-Arabian Inscriptions (A. Jamme)

Translators and annotators
W. F. Albright, Johns Hopkins University
H. L. Ginsberg, Jewish Theological Seminary
Albrecht Goetze, Yale University
A. Jamme, Society of White Fathers of Africa
S. N. Kramer, University of Pennsylvania
Theophile J. Meek, University of Toronto
A. Leo Oppenheim, University of Chicago
Robert H. Pfeiffer, Harvard University
Franz Rosenthal, University of Pennsylvania
Abraham Sachs, Brown University
E. A. Speiser, University of Pennsylvania
Ferris J. Stephens, Yale University
John A. Wilson, University of Chicago

See also
 Wisdom literature

References

Sources
 Pritchard, James B. (1950) Ancient Near Eastern texts relating to the Old Testament, Princeton University Press, 1st edition BooksGoogle snippets/search

1950 non-fiction books
Old Testament
Religious studies books
Translations into English
Mythology books
Ancient Near East
Books about the Bible
Princeton University Press books